Hypocrita escuintla is a moth of the family Erebidae. It was described by William Schaus in 1920. It is found in Guatemala.

References

External links

Hypocrita
Moths described in 1920